Anelaphus subdepressus is a species of beetle in the family Cerambycidae. It was described by Schaeffer in 1904.

References

Anelaphus
Beetles described in 1904